Tahmasp is the name of two Safavid shahs of Persia:
Tahmasp I (reigned 1524–1576)
Tahmasp II (reigned 1729–1732)